Ona Speedway is an Auto racing oval short track venue located in Ona, West Virginia. Ona Speedway is known for being the only paved oval race track in West Virginia and hosting NASCAR Cup Series races in 1963, 1964, 1970, & 1971.  It is located adjacent to the Ona Airpark between the cities of Huntington and Charleston.

Track history

1960s
Constructed in 1962 by West Virginia Sports and Motor Sports Inc at a cost of $750,000, the track was phase 1 of a larger project that would include a 1.375-mile superspeedway and football field. The track hosted two NASCAR Cup Series races in the 1960s. 
The 1963 Mountaineer 300 was held on August 18th, 1963 with an attendance of 16,000. The 300 lap race was won by Fred Lorenzen.
The 1964 Mountaineer 500 was held on August 16th, 1964 with an attendance of 12,000. The 500 lap race was won by Richard Petty. During the race pieces of the pavement cracked and became displaced causing complaints from many of the drivers.
Other notable drivers who raced at the track include Junior Johnson, Ned Jarrett, Jim Paschal, David Pearson, Wendell Scott, Buck Baker, and Joe Weatherly. 
In 1965 NASCAR did not return to Ona and the planned 1.375-mile superspeedway was canceled. A denied direct-access interstate ramp was partly blamed along with declining attendance, low driver payout, and the pavement issue during the 1964 race. The track continued to operate with local racing until it was purchased by entertainer Dick Clark and the Lashinsky brothers in 1969.

Unbuilt superspeedway
The West Virginia Superspeedway was planned to be 1.375 miles in length with 32° banked corners, 12° straits, and 40ft wide racing surface. It was planned to be a tri-oval layout with a 30,000 seating capacity, a football field between pit road and the front stretch grandstands, and a pit area large enough to serve 50 cars. The track was expected to be similar to Darlington Raceway in terms of speed and fan attendance. The original backstretch wall was built with the short track and still stands today.

1970s
The track hosted two NASCAR Cup Series races in the 1970s and became a local concert venue.
On June 12, 1970 it hosted the "Summers On Festival" with bands Grand Funk Railroad, Zephyr, Bloodrock, Heavy Rain, and Quiet.
The 1970 West Virginia 300 was held on August 11th, 1970 with an attendance of 8,600. The 300 lap race was won by Richard Petty. During the race the track lighting system went out leaving drivers in the dark as the cars did not have headlights.
The 1971 West Virginia 500 was held on August 8, 1971 with an attendance of 10,000. The 500 lap race was won by Richard Petty.
Other notable drivers who raced at the track in the 1970s include James Hylton, Dave Marcis, Cecil Gordon, Elmo Langley, Ron Keselowski, Bobby Isaac, Bobby Allison, Buddy Baker, and Benny Parsons.
The track shut down in 1976 after financial trouble after removal from the NASCAR schedule.

1980s
The track sat dormant with no known races held at the facility.
The adjacent Ona Airpark was completed and opened in 1987.

1990s
In 1995, the track was repaved and reopened by Donnie Chapman. The track record of 16.40 was set by Charlie Perry racing an open-wheel modified in 1997. On June 28th, 1997 the track hosted Nascar Drivers Ernie Irvan, Sterling Marlin, Kenny Wallace and Jeremy Mayfield.

On July 18, 1998 Cale Yarborough, David Pearson, Harry Gant, Buddy Baker and Bobby Allison raced trucks in a special exhibition race.

The track continued to host with weekly racing throughout the decade.

2000s
On June 7, 2003 the track hosted NASCAR drivers Michael Waltrip, Sterling Marlin, Jeff Green, and Kenny Wallace. The Orange County Choppers also were in attendance.
In 2007 the track hosted NASCAR drivers Dale Earnhardt Jr., Sterling Marlin, Martin Truex Jr., Kenny Wallace, and Clint Bowyer

2010s–present
The track is currently operating, hosting bi-weekly stock car racing. Classes of cars raced include Late Models, Modifieds, Legends, Hobby Stocks, Classics, Compacts, and UCAR.

References

External links
Ona Speedway Official Website
https://www.onaspeedway.com/

Ona Speedway Facebook Page
https://www.facebook.com/Ona-Speedway-119937481431577/

Ona Speedway History Facebook Group
https://www.facebook.com/groups/163571698791140/

NASCAR tracks
Motorsport venues in West Virginia